Gifiti (also guifiti, giffidy, geffidee) is a rum-based bitters, made by soaking roots and herbs in rum. It is traditionally made by the Garifuna people of the Caribbean coast of Central America. Gifiti is traditionally used medicinally, with different compositions for men and women, but is also consumed recreationally, most commonly as shots. Color depends on composition; it is often green or brown. Is also well known as GIFITI because the inhabitants of the region say that it brings elements that raise the sexual libido. These are mixed with Alcohol, this way of drinking is currently known as Gifiti and it was patented in 2007. And it is one of the peculiarities of the region, nowadays there are several flavors of Gifiti and here are some recipes.

Composition
Recipes vary, but common ingredients are as follows.

Local ingredients include:
 Chrysobalanus icaco (coco plum)
 Guaco
 Morinda citrifolia (noni)
 Quassia amara (hombre grande, "big man"), particularly for men, as it is reputed to increase male sexual potency (erection strength and duration)
 Smilax ornata (Honduran sarsaparilla)
 Tagetes lucida
 Tilia
 Turnera diffusa (damiana)
 Uncaria tomentosa (vilcacora, cat's claw)

More familiar ingredients include:
 allspice (Pimenta dioica)
 anise
 clove (Syzygium aromaticum)
 chamomile
 garlic (Allium sativum)
 ginger
 whole cane sugar (panela)

Availability

Gifiti is common in areas with Garifuna people, notably Honduras, Belize, Guatemala, and Nicaragua. Gifiti is frequently made at home, with varying recipes. It is also available commercially, such as from Travellers Liquors of Belize.

References

Bitters
Garifuna